Altra may refer to:

Places
Altra College, a school in Amsterdam, Netherlands
Altra, Nordland, an island in Alstahaug municipality in Nordland county, Norway

Businesses
Altra Industrial Motion, a power transmission products manufacturer
Altra Running, an athletic footwear company

Other
Nissan Altra, a model of car
L'Altra, an American band formed in 1999
L'Altra (film), a 1947 Italian film